All My Tomorrows is an album by the American country music singer Crystal Gayle. Released on September 30, 2003, it was Gayle first studio album of mainstream songs in several years (her previous few albums being either gospel/Christian music or children's songs).

The album is a collection of classic standards including Jo Stafford's "You Belong to Me" and the ballad "Cry Me a River".

Track listing

References

2003 albums
Crystal Gayle albums